o-Toluidine (ortho-toluidine) is an organic compound with the chemical formula CH3C6H4NH2. It is the most important of the three isomeric toluidines. It is a colorless liquid although commercial samples are often yellowish. It is a precursor to the herbicides metolachlor and acetochlor.

Synthesis and reactions
o-Toluidine is produced industrially by nitration of toluene to give a mixture of nitrotoluenes, favoring the ortho isomer. This mixture is separated by distillation. 2-Nitrotoluene is hydrogenated to give o-toluidine.

The conversion of o-toluidine to the diazonium salt gives access to the 2-bromo, 2-cyano-, and 2-chlorotoluene derivatives.

 N-acetylation is also demonstrated.

Prilocaine, an amino amide-type local anesthetic, yields o-toluidine when metabolized by carboxylesterase enzymes. Large prilocaine doses can cause methemoglobinemia due to oxidation of hemoglobin by o-toluidine.

Metabolism

Absorption distribution and excretion
o-Toluidine is absorbed through inhalation and dermal contact. Extensive absorption of o-toluidine from the gastrointestinal tract was observed. The main excretion pathway is through the urine where up to one-third of the administered compound was recovered unchanged. Major metabolites are 4-amino-m-cresol and to a lesser extent, N-acetyl-4-amino-m-cresol, azoxytoluene, o-nitrosotoluene, N-acetyl-o-toluidine, N-acetyl-o-aminobenzyl alcohol, anthranilic acid, N-acetyl-anthranilic acid, 2-amino-m-cresol, p-hydroxy-o-toluidine. Conjugates that were formed were predominated by sulfate conjugates over glucuronide conjugates by a ratio of 6:1.

The metabolism of o-toluidine involves many competing activating and deactivating pathways, including N-acetylation, N-oxidation and N-hydroxylation, and ring oxidation. 4-Hydroxylation and N-acetylation of toluidine are the major metabolic pathways in rats. The primary metabolism of o-toluidine takes place in the endoplasmic reticulum. Exposure to o-toluidine enhances the microsomal activity of aryl hydrocarbon hydroxylase (particularly in the kidney), NADPH-cytochrome c reductase and the content of cytochrome P-450. Cytochrome P450–mediated N-hydroxylation to N-hydroxy-o-toluidine, a carcinogenic metabolite, occurs in the liver. N-Hydroxy-o-toluidine can be either metabolized to o-nitrosotoluene or conjugated with glucuronic acid or sulfate and transported to the urinary bladder via the blood. Once in the bladder, N-hydroxy-o-toluidine can be released from the conjugates in an acidic urine environment to either react directly with DNA or be bio-activated via sulfation or acetylation by cytosolic sulfotransferases or N-acetyltransferases (presumably NAT1). The postulated activated form (based on comparison with other aromatic amines), N-acetoxy-o-toluidine, is a reactive ester that forms electrophilic arylnitrenium ions that can bind to DNA. Other activation pathways (ring-oxidation pathways) for aromatic amines include peroxidase-catalyzed reactions that form reactive metabolites (quinone-imines formed from nonconjugated phenolic metabolites) in the bladder. These metabolites can produce reactive oxygen species, resulting in oxidative cellular damage and compensatory cell proliferation. Support for this mechanism comes from studies of oxidative DNA damage induced by o-toluidine metabolites in cultured human cells (HL-60), calf thymus DNA, and DNA fragments from key genes thought to be involved in carcinogenesis (the c-Ha-ras oncogene and the p53 tumor-suppressor gene). Also supporting this mechanism are observations of o-toluidine-induced DNA damage (strand breaks) in cultured human bladder cells and bladder cells from rats and mice exposed in vivo to o-toluidine.

Binding of hemoglobin
Metabolites of o-toluidine bind hemoglobin in rats. The relevant metabolite is thought to be o-nitrosotoluene. which also causes urinary-bladder cancer in rats. Nitrosotoluene converts hemoglobin to methemoglobin, resulting in methemoglobinemia. Evidence suggests that this pathway is relevant to humans.

Carcinogenicity
Although the mechanisms of carcinogenicity of o-toluidine are not completely understood, the available evidence suggests that they are complex and involve several key modes of action, including metabolic activation that results in binding of reactive metabolites to DNA and proteins, mutagenicity, oxidative DNA damage, chromosomal damage, and cytotoxicity.

In the U.S., o-toluidine was first listed in the Third Annual Report on Carcinogens as ‘reasonably anticipated to be a human carcinogen’ in 1983, based on sufficient evidence from studies in experimental animals. The Report on Carcinogens (RoC) is a U.S. congressionally-mandated, science-based public health report that identifies agents, substances, mixtures, or exposures in the environment that pose a hazard to people residing in the United States Since then, other cancer related studies have been published and the listing of o-toluidine was changed to ‘known to be a human carcinogen’. o-toluidine was especially linked to bladder cancer. This was done 31 years later in the Thirteenth Report on Carcinogens (2014). The International Agency for Research on Cancer (IARC) has classified o-toluidine as ‘carcinogenic to humans (group 1)’.

Toxicology

The main excretion-pathway is revealed to be through urine where up to one-third of the administered compound was recovered unchanged. o-toluidine and metabolites are known to bind to hemoglobin. The o-toluidine metabolite o-nitrosotoluene, is proven to cause bladder cancer in rats and is thought to bind to hemoglobin in humans.  o-Toluidine exposure has been researched in a number of different degrees in animals.

Single exposure
o-Toluidine was found to be harmful to rats following acute oral exposure with LD50 of 900 and 940 mg/kg bodyweight. The compound was also found to be of low toxicity in rabbits following acute dermal exposure with an LD50 of 320 mg/kg bodyweight. Toxicity following inhalation was not identified. Symptoms following acute exposure include cyanosis (blue or purple coloration of the skin due to low oxygen saturation in the tissue), increased methemoglobin levels and moderate skin irritation and severe eye irritation in rabbits.

Short-term exposure
Only oral short-term exposure in rats was researched of o-toluidine. Dermal exposure affected the ovarian cycle, ovary morphostructure, the ability to reproduce and the progeny in female rats when administered for four months (Malysheva and Zaitseva, 1982). Male rats treated similarly showed stimulated spermatogenesis (production of sperm cells) (Malysheva et al., 1983). Inhalation exposure was not identified. Rats were administered with the compound with a dose of 1125 mg/kg bodyweight over five days (225 mg/kg bodyweight per day). Observed symptoms included increased methemoglobin levels, congestion, hemosiderosis (iron overload disorder), hematopoiesis (formation of blood cellular components) in the spleen and a 1.5 to 3.0 times increase in spleen weight.

Chronic exposure
Chronic oral exposure to o-toluidine hydrochloride has induced increased incidences of tumors (benign and malignant) in rats and mice. In one study, rats were given doses of approximately 150 and 300 mg/kg bodyweight (low dose and high dose), a control-group was also present (NCI, 1979; Goodman et al., 1984). The exposure was associated with dose-related decrease in bodyweight gain, decrease in survival and with increased incidences of numerous types of cancer (sarcomas, angiosarcomas, fibrosarcomas, osteosarcomas, fibromas, fibroadenomas and mesothelioma). Non-neoplastic effects were also observed. These included hyperplasia (abnormal increase in volume of tissue), fibrosis (formation of excess fibrous connective tissue) and liver necrosis (premature death of cells in living tissue). Multiple other studies where rats or mice were given o-toluidine over a prolonged period of time had similar results, including but not limited to a decrease in survivability and increased incidences of different types of cancer (Hecht et al., 1982; Weisburger et al., 1978; NCI, 1979; Weisburger et al., 1978).

Human exposure 
Acute human exposure to o-toluidine can cause painful hematuria (presence of red blood cells in the urine) (Goldbarb and Finelli, 1974). Chronic exposure to o-toluidine in humans was also observed in multiple retrospective cohort studies in the dyestuff industry. The results include increased incidence of death and increased incidence of bladder cancer. It proved difficult however to definitively link these to o-toluidine in due to the exposure to other expected carcinogenic compounds in the dyestuff industry. One study assessed the increased incidences of mortality and bladder cancer in 906 employers of a dyestuff factory in northern Italy over a mean latent period of 25 years. Mortality from bladder cancer was significantly higher in the employers than the people only exposed to the particular chemicals present in the factory, in use or intermittent contact. o-Toluidine was concluded to be almost certainly capable of causing bladder cancer in men.

Another study recorder expected and observed cases of bladder cancer at a rubber factory in upstate New York (Ward et al., 1991). The study assessed 1,749 male and female employees over a period of 15 years. Exposure was primarily to o-toluidine and aniline and a significant increase in incidences of bladder cancer was observed. However, the carcinogenicity could not be attributed to o-toluidine definitively. Other studies include Vigliani & Barsotti (1961), Khlebnikova et al. (1970), Zavon et al. (1973), Conso & Pontal (1982), and Rubino et al. (1982).

The specific mechanisms of carcinogenicity of o-toluidine are not completely understood, but they are known to be complex and to involve metabolic activation, which results in formation of reactive metabolites. The earlier mentioned o-nitrosotoluene, which causes cancer in rats, is an example of these reactive metabolites. Research has indicated that o-toluidine is a mutagen and causes oxidative DNA damage and chromosomal damage (Skipper et al. 2010). Multiple studies have shown that the compound induces oxidative DNA damage and strand breaks in cultured human cells (Watanabe et al. 2010; Ohkuma et al. 1999, Watanabe et al. 2010). DNA damage was also observed in rats and mice exposed in vivo to o-toluidine (Robbiano et al. 2002, Sekihashi et al. 2002) and even large scale chromosomal damage was observed in yeast and mammalian cells exposed to o-toluidine in vitro. More generally, chromosomal instability is known to be induced by aromatic amines in urinary bladder cells. Chromosomal instability may lead to both aneuploidy (presence of an abnormal number of chromosomes in a cell), which is observed in cancer cells, and loss of heterozygosity (loss of the entire gene and the surrounding chromosomal region), which can result in the absence of a tumor suppressor gene (Höglund et al. 2001, Sandberg 2002, Phillips and Richardson 2006).

Specific determination of glucose
o-Toluidine can also be used for measuring serum glucose concentration, in the form of acetic acid–o-toluidine. The o-toluidine reaction for the estimation of glucose concentration in the serum gained massive popularity in the 1970s. This method was mostly used by clinical laboratories. Because of the potential health hazard, the laboratories now have a modified method by using alternative compounds.

References

Anilines
Alkyl-substituted benzenes